Rebecca F. Kuang is a Chinese-American fantasy writer. Her first novel, The Poppy War, was released in 2018, followed by the sequels The Dragon Republic in 2019 and The Burning God in 2020. Kuang released a stand-alone novel, Babel, or the Necessity of Violence, in 2022. Kuang has won the Compton Crook Award, the Crawford Award, and the 2020 Astounding Award for Best New Writer, along with being a finalist for the Nebula, Locus, World Fantasy, The Kitschies, and British Fantasy awards for her first novel.

Early life and education 
Kuang immigrated to the United States from Guangzhou, China, with her family when she was four years old. Her father grew up in Leiyang, in Hunan province, and her mother grew up on Hainan Island. Her maternal grandfather fought for Chiang Kai-shek. Her father's family experienced the Japanese conquest of Hunan.

Kuang grew up in Dallas, Texas and graduated from Greenhill School in 2013. She attended Georgetown University, majoring in History, attracted by the college's well-known debating team after winning the Tournament of Champions. Halfway through college, Kuang was 19 when she began writing Poppy War during a gap year in China, where she worked as a debate coach; the book was published when she was 22. Kuang graduated from the Odyssey Writing Workshop in 2016 and attended the CSSF Novel Writing Workshop in 2017. She graduated from Georgetown's School of Foreign Service in June 2018. She spent the summer after graduation coaching a debate camp in Colorado.

Kuang attended Magdalene College, University of Cambridge as a recipient of a 2018 Marshall Scholarship, where she gained a Master of Philosophy in Chinese Studies. The following academic year, she studied at Oxford University and received an MSc in Contemporary Chinese Studies. Kuang returned to the United States in the fall of 2020 to pursue a PhD in East Asian Languages and Literatures at Yale University.

Kuang was originally scheduled to deliver the 8th annual J.R.R. Tolkien Lecture on Fantasy Literature at Pembroke College, Oxford in 2020, but it was postponed to the following year due to the world-wide COVID-19 pandemic. She took part in a virtual seminar that was held in place of the postponed annual seminar. Kuang delivered the Tolkien Lecture in person on May 23, 2022.

Literary works
Her debut novel The Poppy War, a Chinese military fantasy, was published by Harper Voyager in 2018 and is the first book in the Poppy War trilogy. The Poppy War has received mainly favorable reviews, with Publishers Weekly calling it “a strong and dramatic launch to Kuang's career”. In October 2020, her first two books in the Poppy Wars trilogy were included in Time Magazine's The 100 Best Fantasy Books of All Time (The Burning God was not available when the article was published). In December 2020, Starlight Media, the U.S. film subsidiary of China-based Starlight Culture Entertainment Group, optioned the rights to adapt Kuang's Poppy Wars trilogy for television.

In 2020, she wrote a short story in the Star Wars universe called Against All Odds about a Rebel Alliance defender on the ice planet Hoth named Dak Ralter. It was published in the anthology From a Certain Point of View: 40 Stories celebrating 40 years of The Empire Strikes Back.

Poppy Wars trilogy
Peter Luo's Starlight Media and SA Inc will adapt The Poppy Wars trilogy for television.

The Poppy War 

The Poppy War, a grimdark fantasy, draws its plot and politics from mid-20th-century China, with the conflict in the novel based on the Second Sino-Japanese War, and an atmosphere inspired by the Song dynasty. The Poppy War was nominated for the 2019 World Fantasy Award for Best Novel.

The Dragon Republic 

Released in 2019, The Dragon Republic is the sequel to The Poppy War. The Nikan Empire begins to fall apart due to in fighting and the Hesperians return. The reviewer for Fantasy Book Review wrote, “Kuang excels at wreaking emotional havoc while delivering a powerful meditation on war and survival.” Publishers Weekly said that “Kuang brings brilliance to this invigorating and complex military fantasy sequel to The Poppy War.”

The Burning God 

Released in 2020, The Burning God is the sequel to The Dragon Republic and the conclusion to the Poppy Wars series. Rin fights the forces that have torn her country apart into a civil war. A reviewer for The Fantasy Hive wrote, “Rebecca Kuang's conclusion to her debut trilogy, The Poppy War, is testament to her growth as a writer; not only is it a fitting close to an ambitious series." The reviewer for Publishers Weekly said that "[t]he result is a satisfying if not happy end to the series.”

Babel 

In May 2021, Kuang announced the August 2022 release of her fourth novel, Babel, or the Necessity of Violence: An Arcane History of the Oxford Translators' Revolution, by Harper Voyager. Babel is set in 1830s England. In the second week of September 2022, Babel debuted at the top spot on The New York Times Best Seller list for hardcover fiction, but dropped to the ninth spot the following week before disappearing from the list by the end of the month.

Yellowface 
In October 2021, Kuang announced that her fifth novel, Yellowface, will be published in 2023. William Morrow and Company said Yellowface follows “a white author who steals an unpublished manuscript, written by a more successful Asian American novelist who died in a freak accident, and publishes it as her own”.

Awards and honors 
In 2018, Barnes & Noble included The Poppy War on their list of Favorite Science Fiction & Fantasy Books of 2018.

In 2022, Amazon, Kirkus Reviews, NPR, and The Washington Post named Babel, or the Necessity of Violence one of the best science fiction and fantasy books of the year. Barnes & Noble named it one of the top ten books of the year, regardless of genre.

Bibliography

Poppy War series 
 The Poppy War (May 2018), 
 The Dragon Republic (August 2019), 
 The Burning God (November 2020),

Other novels
 Babel, or the Necessity of Violence: An Arcane History of the Oxford Translators’ Revolution (August 2022), 
 Yellowface (May 2023),

Short stories
 “The Nine Curves River” in the anthology The Book of Dragons (July 2020; edited by Jonathan Strahan  (story read by LeVar Burton via the LeVar Burton Podcast)
 “Against All Odds” in the anthology From a Certain Point of View: 40 stories celebrating 40 years of The Empire Strikes Back (November 2020)

Academic lectures and symposia
  (includes reading list of topics mentioned in the symposium)

References

External links 
 
 
 
 
Academic lectures and symposia
  (includes reading list of topics mentioned in the symposium)
 

21st-century American novelists
21st-century American women writers
American fantasy writers
Women science fiction and fantasy writers
Chinese-American literature
1996 births
Living people
Writers from Guangzhou
Georgetown University alumni
Alumni of Magdalene College, Cambridge
21st-century Chinese women writers
21st-century Chinese writers
Marshall Scholars
Greenhill School alumni
John W. Campbell Award for Best New Writer winners